The 2014–15 Basketball Cup of Serbia is the 9th season of the Serbian 2nd-tier men's cup tournament.

Vršac-based team Vršac Swisslion won the Cup.

Bracket
Source: Basketball Federation of Serbia

See also 
 2014–15 Radivoj Korać Cup
 2014–15 Basketball League of Serbia

References

External links 
 Basketball Competitions of Serbia

Basketball Cup of Serbia
Cup